A sustainable business, or a green business, is an enterprise that has minimal negative impact or potentially a positive effect on the global or local environment, community, society, or economy—a business that strives to meet the triple bottom line. They cluster under different groupings and the whole is sometimes referred to as "green capitalism." Often, sustainable businesses have progressive environmental and human rights policies. In general, business is described as green if it matches the following four criteria:
 It incorporates principles of sustainability into each of its business decisions.
 It supplies environmentally friendly products or services that replaces demand for nongreen products and/or services.
 It is greener than traditional competition.
 It has made an enduring commitment to environmental principles in its business operations.

Terminology
A sustainable business is any organization that participates in Environmentally friendly or green activities to ensure that all processes, products, and manufacturing activities adequately address current environmental concerns while maintaining a profit. In other words, it is a business that “meets the needs of the present [world] without compromising the ability of future generations to meet their own needs.” It is the process of assessing how to design products that will take advantage of the current environmental situation and how well a company’s products perform with renewable resources.

The Brundtland Report emphasized that sustainability is a three-legged stool of people, planet, and profit. Sustainable businesses with the supply chain try to balance all three through the triple-bottom-line concept—using sustainable development and sustainable distribution to affect the environment, business growth, and the society.

Everyone affects the sustainability of the marketplace and the planet in some way. Sustainable development within a business can create value for customers, investors, and the environment. A sustainable business must meet customer needs while, at the same time, treating the environment well. 

To succeed in such an approach, where stakeholder balancing and joint solutions are key, requires a structural approach. One philosophy, that includes many different tools and methods, is the concept of Sustainable Enterprise Excellence. Another is the adoption of the concept of responsible growth.

Sustainability is often confused with corporate social responsibility (CSR), though the two are not the same. Bansal and DesJardine (2014) state that the notion of ‘time’ discriminates sustainability from CSR and other similar concepts.  Whereas ethics, morality, and norms permeate CSR, sustainability only obliges businesses to make intertemporal trade-offs to safeguard intergenerational equity. 

Short-termism is the bane of sustainability. While CSR and sustainability are not the same, they are related to each other. Determining salaries, implementing new technology, and retiring old plants all have an impact on the firm's stakeholders and the natural environment.

Green business has been seen as a possible mediator of economic-environmental relations, and if proliferated, would serve to diversify our economy, even if it has a negligible effect on lowering atmospheric CO2 levels. The definition of "green jobs" is ambiguous, but it is generally agreed that these jobs, the result of green business, should be linked to "clean energy" and contribute to the reduction of greenhouse gases. These corporations can be seen as generators of not only "green energy", but as producers of new "materialises" that are the product of the technologies, these firms developed and deployed.

Environmental sphere
A major initiative of sustainable businesses is to eliminate or decrease the environmental harm caused by the production and consumption of their goods.<ref>Becker, T. (2008). "The Business behind Green, Eliminating fear, uncertainty, and doubt." APICS magazine. vol. 18, no. 2.</ref> The impact of such human activities in terms of the number of greenhouse gases produced can be measured in units of carbon dioxide and is referred to as the carbon footprint. The carbon footprint concept is derived from the ecological footprint analysis, which examines the ecological capacity required to support the consumption of products.

Businesses take a wide range of green initiatives. One of the most common examples is the act of "going paperless" or sending electronic correspondence in lieu of paper when possible. On a higher level, examples of sustainable business practices include: refurbishing used products (e.g., tuning up lightly used commercial fitness equipment for resale); revising production processes to eliminate waste (such as using a more accurate template to cut out designs), and choosing nontoxic raw materials and processes. For example, Canadian farmers have found that hemp is a sustainable alternative to rapeseed in their traditional crop rotation; hemp grown for fiber or seed requires no pesticides or herbicides. Another example is upcycling clothes or textiles, in which businesses can upcycle products to maintain or increase their quality.

Sustainable business leaders also take into account the life cycle costs for the items they produce. Input costs must be considered regarding regulations, energy use, storage, and disposal. Designing for the environment DFE is also an element of sustainable business. This process enables users to consider the potential environmental impacts of a product and the process used to make that product.

The many possibilities for adopting green practices have led to considerable pressure being put upon companies from consumers, employees, government regulators, and other stakeholders. Some companies have resorted to greenwashing instead of making meaningful changes, merely marketing their products in ways that suggest green practices. For example, various producers in the bamboo fiber industry have been taken to court for advertising their products as "greener" than they are. Still, countless other companies have taken the sustainability trend seriously and are enjoying profits. In their book “Corporate Sustainability in International Comparison”, Schaltegger et al. (2014) analyzes the current state of corporate sustainability management and corporate social responsibility across eleven countries. Their research is based on an extensive survey focusing on the companies’ intention to pursue sustainability management (i.e. motivation; issues), the integration of sustainability in the organization (i.e. connecting sustainability to the core business; involving corporate functions; using drivers of business cases for sustainability) and the actual implementation of sustainability management measures (i.e. stakeholder management; sustainability management tools and standards; measurements). The Gort Cloud written by Richard Seireeni, (2009), documents the experiences of sustainable businesses in America and their reliance on the vast but invisible green community, referred to as the Gort cloud, for support and a market.

Green investment firms are consequently attracting unprecedented interest. In the UK, for instance, the Green Investment Bank is devoted exclusively to supporting renewable domestic energy. However, the UK and Europe as a whole are falling behind the impressive pace set by developing nations in terms of green development. Thus, green investment firms are creating more and more opportunities to support sustainable development practices in emerging economies. By providing micro-loans and larger investments, these firms assist small business owners in developing nations who seek business education, affordable loans, and new distribution networks for their "green" products.

An effective way for businesses to contribute towards waste reduction is to remanufacture products so that the materials used can have a longer lifespan.

Sustainable Businesses

The Harvard Business School business historian Geoffrey Jones (academic) has traced the historical origins of green business back to pioneering start-ups in organic food and wind and solar energy before World War 1. Among large corporations, Ford Motor Company occupies an odd role in the story of sustainability. Ironically, founder Henry Ford was a pioneer in the sustainable business realm, experimenting with plant-based fuels during the days of the Model T. Ford Motor Company also shipped the Model A truck in crates that then became the vehicle floorboards at the factory destination. This was a form of upcycling, retaining high quality in a closed-loop industrial cycle. Furthermore, the original auto body was made of a stronger-than-steel hemp composite. Today, of course, Fords aren't made of hemp, nor do they run on the most sensible fuel. Currently, Ford's claim to eco-friendly fame is the use of seat fabric made from 100% post-industrial materials and renewable soy foam seat bases. Ford executives recently appointed the company’s first senior vice president of sustainability, environment, and safety engineering. This position is responsible for establishing a long-range sustainability strategy and environmental policy, developing the products and processes necessary to satisfy customers and society as a whole while working toward energy independence. It remains to be seen whether Ford will return to its founder's vision of a petroleum-free automobile, a vehicle powered by the remains of plant matter.

The automobile manufacturer Subaru has also made efforts to tackle sustainability. In 2008 a Subaru assembly plant in Lafayette became the first auto manufacturer to achieve zero landfill status when the plant implemented sustainable policies. The company successfully managed to implement a plan that increased refuse recycling to 99.8%. In 2012, the corporation increased the reuse of Styrofoam by 9%. And from the year 2008 to the year 2012, environmental incidents and accidents reduced from 18 to 4.

Smaller companies such as Nature's Path, an organic cereal and snack making business, have also made sustainability gains in the 21st century. CEO Arran Stephens and his associates have ensured that the quickly growing company's products are produced without toxic farm chemicals. Furthermore, employees are encouraged to find ways to reduce consumption. Sustainability is an essential part of corporate discussions. Another example comes from Salt Spring Coffee, a company created in 1996 as a certified organic, fair trade, coffee producer. In recent years they have become carbon neutral, lowering emissions by reducing long-range trucking and using bio-diesel in delivery trucks, upgrading to energy efficient equipment and purchasing carbon offsets. The company claims to offer the first carbon neutral coffee sold in Canada. Salt Spring Coffee was recognized by the David Suzuki Foundation in the 2010 report Doing Business in a New Climate''. A third example comes from Korea, where rice husks are used as a nontoxic packaging for stereo components and other electronics. The same material is later recycled to make bricks.

Some companies in the textile industry have been moving towards more sustainable business practices. Specifically, the clothing company Patagonia has focused on reducing consumption and waste. The company limits its environmental impact by ensuring only recycled and organic materials, repairing damaged clothes, and by complying with strong environmental protection standards for its entire supply chain. 

Some companies in the mining and specifically gold mining industries are attempting to move towards more sustainable practices, especially given that the industry is one of the most environmentally destructive. Indeed, regarding gold mining, Northwestern University scientists have, in the laboratory, discovered an inexpensive and environmentally sustainable method that uses simple cornstarch—instead of cyanide—to isolate gold from raw materials in a selective manner. Such a method will reduce the amount of cyanide released into the environment during gold extraction from raw ore, with one of the Northwestern University scientists, Sir Fraser Stoddart stating that: “The elimination of cyanide from the gold industry is of the utmost importance environmentally". Additionally, the retail jewelry industry is now trying to be more sustainable, with companies using green energy providers and recycling more, as well as preventing the use of mined-so called 'virgin gold' by applying re-finishing methods on pieces and re-selling them. Furthermore, the customer may opt for Fairtrade Gold, which gives a better deal to small scale and artisanal miners, and is an element of sustainable business. However, not all think that mining can be sustainable and much more must be done, noting that mining in general is in need of greater regional and international legislation and regulation, which is a valid point given the huge impact mining has on the planet and the huge number of products and goods that are made wholly or partly from mined materials.

In the luxury sector, in 2012, the group Kering developed the "Environmental Profit & Loss account" (EP&L) accounting method to track the progress of its sustainability goals, a strategy aligned with the UN Sustainable Development Goals. In 2019, on a request from the President Emmanuel Macron, François-Henri Pinault, Chairman and CEO of the luxury group Kering, presented the Fashion Pact during the summit, an initiative signed by 32 fashion firms committing to concrete measures to reduce their environmental impact. By 2020, 60 firms joined the Fashion Pact.

Fair Trade is a form of sustainable business and among the highest forms of CSR (Corporate Social Responsibility). Organizations that participate in Fair Trade typically adhere to the ten principles of the World Fair Trade Organisation (WFTO).  Moreover, Fair Trade promotes entrepreneurial development among communities in developing countries and it encourages communities to be responsible and accountable for their economic development via market engagement. Fair Trade is a form of marketing with a strong and direct social benefit beyond the economic supply chain.

Social sphere
Organizations that give back to the community, whether through employees volunteering their time or through charitable donations, are often considered socially sustainable. Organizations can also encourage education in their communities by training their employees and offering internships to younger members of the community. Practices such as these increase the education level and quality of life in the community.

For a business to be truly sustainable, it must sustain not only the necessary environmental resources, but also social resources—including employees, customers (the community), and its reputation.

A term that is directly relates to the social aspect of sustainability is Environmental justice. Sustainability and social justice are directly connected to one another, and seeing these as separate unrelated issues can lead to more problems for the environment and potentially businesses.

Consumers and Marketing 
When people are choosing to purchase goods or services, they care what a company stands for. This includes social and environmental aspects that may not have seemed important in business in the past. Consumers nowadays are demanding more sustainable goods and services.  Because of this demand, companies must focus on their environmental impact to gain consumer loyalty. Because ecological awareness can be treated as a choice of personal taste rather than a necessity, it can be a method to try to increase capital from a marketing standpoint. When marketing a product or service it is important that a business is actually following through with environmental claims, and not just pretending to be in order to gain customers. False advertising leads to distrust among consumers and can ultimately end a company.

Greenwashing 
With the idea of sustainability becoming more prevalent in the last decade, businesses must be aware of laws surrounding it and the potential legal implications. The Federal Trade Commission (FTC), Green guides are essentially a rulebook for businesses on how to avoid deceiving consumers with false advertising. This often is a problem when companies make vague or false environmental claims about a product or service they are selling. When this occurs, it can be called "greenwashing". Greenwashing can also be described as the act of overexaggerating the beneficial effect the product has on the environment. If companies do not follow this guide, they could be subject to legal ramifications. It is also important for green businesses to invest in experienced legal practitioners who can understand and can provide counsel on the FTC guidelines.

Organizations
The European community’s Restriction of Hazardous Substances Directive restricts the use of certain hazardous materials in the production of various electronic and electrical products. Waste Electrical and Electronic Equipment (WEEE) directives provide collection, recycling, and recovery practices for electrical goods.  The World Business Council for Sustainable Development and the World Resources Institute are two organizations working together to set a standard for reporting on corporate carbon footprints.  From October 2013, all quoted companies in the UK are legally required to report their annual greenhouse gas emissions in their directors’ report, under the Companies Act 2006 (Strategic and Directors’ Reports) Regulations 2013.

Lester Brown’s Plan B 2.0 and Hunter Lovins’s Natural Capitalism provide information on sustainability initiatives.

Corporate sustainability strategies
Corporate sustainability strategies can aim to take advantage of sustainable revenue opportunities, while protecting the value of business against increasing energy costs, the costs of meeting regulatory requirements, changes in the way customers perceive brands and products, and the volatile price of resources.

Not all eco-strategies can be incorporated into a company's Eco-portfolio immediately. The widely practiced strategies include: Innovation, Collaboration, Process Improvement and Sustainability reporting. 
Innovation & Technology: This introverted method of sustainable corporate practices focuses on a company's ability to change its products and services towards less waste production.
Collaboration: The formation of networks with similar or partner companies facilitates knowledge sharing and propels innovation.
Process Improvement: Continuous process surveying and improvement are essential to reduction in waste. Employee awareness of company-wide sustainability plan further aids the integration of new and improved processes.
Sustainability Reporting: Periodic reporting of company performance in relation to goals. These goals are often incorporated into the corporate mission (as in the case of Ford Motor Co.).
 Greening the Supply Chain: Sustainable procurement is important for any sustainability strategy as a company's impact on the environment is much bigger than the products that they consume. The B Corporation (certification) model is a good example of one that encourages companies to focus on this.
 Choosing the Right Leaders: Having educated and driven CEOs on sustainability guide companies in the right steps to being eco-friendly. As the world is slowly transitioning to sustainability, it is important for our company leaders to prioritize and have a sense of urgency. 

Additionally, companies might consider implementing a sound measurement and management system with readjustment procedures, as well as a regular forum for all stakeholders to discuss sustainability issues. The Sustainability Balanced Scorecard is a performance measurement and management system aiming at balancing financial and non-financial as well as short and long-term measures. It explicitly integrates strategically relevant environmental, social and ethical goals into the overall performance management system  and supports strategic sustainability management.

Standards
Enormous economic and population growth worldwide in the second half of the twentieth century aggravated the factors that threaten health and the world — ozone depletion, climate change, resource depletion, fouling of natural resources, and extensive loss of biodiversity and habitat. In the past, the standard approaches to environmental problems generated by business and industry have been regulatory-driven "end-of-the-pipe" remediation efforts. In the 1990s, efforts by governments, NGOs, corporations, and investors began to grow to develop awareness and plans for investment in business sustainability.

One critical milestone was the establishment of the ISO 14000 standards whose development came as a result of the Rio Summit on the Environment held in 1992. ISO 14001 is the cornerstone standard of the ISO 14000 series. It specifies a framework of control for an Environmental Management System against which an organization can be certified by a third party. Other ISO 14000 Series Standards are actually guidelines, many to help you achieve registration to ISO 14001. They include the following:
ISO 14004 provides guidance on the development and implementation of environmental management systems.
ISO 14010 provides general principles of environmental auditing (now superseded by ISO 19011)
ISO 14011 provides specific guidance on audit an environmental management system (now superseded by ISO 19011)
ISO 14012 provides guidance on qualification criteria for environmental auditors and lead auditors (now superseded by ISO 19011)
ISO 14013/5 provides audit program review and assessment material.
ISO 14020+ labeling issues
ISO 14030+ provides guidance on performance targets and monitoring within an Environmental Management System
ISO 14040+ covers life cycle issues

Circular business models 

While the initial focus of academic, industry, and policy activities was mainly focused on the development of re-X (recycling, remanufacturing, reuse, recovery, ...) technology, it soon became clear that the technological capabilities increasingly exceed their implementation. For the transition towards a Circular Economy, different stakeholders have to work together. This shifted attention towards business model innovation as a key leverage for 'circular' technology adaption.

Circular business models are business models that are closing, narrowing, slowing, intensifying, and dematerializing loops, to minimize the resource inputs into and the waste and emission leakage out of the organizational system. This comprises recycling measures (closing), efficiency improvements (narrowing), use phase extensions (slowing or extending), a more intense use phase (intensifying), and the substitution of product utility by service and software solutions (dematerializing).

Certification

Challenges and opportunities
Implementing sustainable business practices may have an effect on profits and a firm's financial 'bottom line'. However, during a time where environmental awareness is popular, green strategies are likely to be embraced by employees, consumers, and other stakeholders. Many organisations concerned about the environmental impact of their business are taking initiatives to invest in sustainable business practices. In fact, a positive correlation has been reported between environmental performance and economic performance. Businesses trying to implement sustainable business need to have insights on balancing the social equity, economic prosperity and environmental quality elements.  

If an organization’s current business model is inherently unsustainable, becoming truly sustainable requires a complete makeover of the business model (e.g. from selling cars to offering car sharing and other mobility services). This can present a major challenge due to the differences between the old and the new model and the respective skills, resources and infrastructure needed. A new business model can offer major opportunities by entering or even creating new markets and reaching new customer groups. The main challenges faced in the sustainable business practices implementation by businesses in developing countries include lack of skilled personnel, technological challenges, socio-economic challenges, organisational challenges and lack of proper policy framework. Skilled personnel plays a crucial role in quality management, enhanced compliance with international quality standards, and preventative and operational maintenance attitude necessary to ensure sustainable business. In the absence of skilled work forces, companies fail to implement a sustainable business model. 

Another major challenge to the effective implementation of sustainable business is organisational challenges. Organisational challenges to the implementation of sustainable business activities arise from the difficulties associated with the planning, implementation and evaluation of sustainable business models. Addressing the organisational challenges for the implementation of sustainable business practices need to begin by analysing the whole supply chain of the business rather than focusing solely on the company's internal operations. Another major challenge is the lack of an appropriate policy framework for sustainable business. Companies often comply with the lowest economic, social and environmental sustainability standards, when in fact the true sustainability can be achieved when the business is focused beyond compliance with integrated strategy, passion and purpose.

Companies leading the way in sustainable business practices can take advantage of sustainable revenue opportunities: according to the Department for Business, Innovation and Skills the UK green economy will grow by 4.9 to 5.5 percent a year by 2015, and the average internal rate of return on energy efficiency investments for large businesses is 48%.  A 2013 survey suggests that demand for green products appears to be increasing: 27% of respondents said they are more likely to buy a sustainable product and/or service than 5 years ago. Furthermore, sustainable business practices may attract talent and generate tax breaks.

See also

B4E Business for the Environment
Green America
B Corporation (certification)
Bottom of the pyramid
Carbon Trust
Clean Edge
Clean Energy Trends
Clean Tech Nation
Cleaner production
Conscious business
Corporate sustainability
Externality
Gort cloud
Green brands
Sustainable MBA
Low carbon economy
The Natural Step
Net Impact
Renewable energy commercialization
Renewable energy industry
Sustainable Business Network
Sustainable finance
Worldchanging

References

External links
 Sustainable Business Ideas For Eco Conscious Entrepreneurs
  David O'Brien Centre for Sustainable Enterprise, Concordia University, Montreal
  Erb Institute for Global Sustainable Enterprise at the University of Michigan
 Center for Sustainable Global Enterprise at Cornell University
 Natural Resources Defense Council
 Sustainable Business Models - On the New Economy
 Magazine MN| Sustainable Business and Eco-innovations

 
Sustainability
Sustainable development